The K-1 Attack Roadster is a sports car built by the Slovak car company K-1 Engineering. The cars are manufactured by hand in Bratislava. The Attack was officially launched in May 2002, but was in development since 1999. The car was originally made for racing, developed by Engineer Dick Kvetnansky and designed by Juraj Mitra and was completed in 2000. The car was built initially as a race car, upon seeing the demand as a road car the car was made available as a kit car using the 90-93 Honda Accord as the donor car. Small modifications could be made to accommodate the H22 engine from the Honda Prelude as well.

History
In May 2002, K-1 Engineering presented the Attack Roadster at the Frankfurt Motor Show (International Automobile Exhibition). Powered by a mid-mounted 3.0-litre (2,967 cc) V-6 Ford Mondeo ST220 engine, producing 178 kW at 7,000 rpm, mated to a 6-speed manual transmission with a rear-wheel drive powertrain. The Attack could accelerate from 0–100 km/h in 5.2 seconds. Top speed was electronically limited to 250 km/h.

In 2003, a K-1 Attack was donated by Richard Kvetnansky to a development team of high school students in the west Philadelphia Learning Academy and was the only Attack with a full carbon fibre body. The team of students was led by the teacher-engineer Simon Hauger, their goal was to build "The World's First Hybrid Supercar". In 2004, the project was completed and won an International fuel efficiency competition in 2005, beating large car manufacturers like Honda, Toyota, and even Tesla. In 2006, it competed again and won, sweeping the competition. The car was capable of a 0–100 km/h (62 mph) time of 3.5 seconds, and gave a fuel economy of up to 24 km/L. The rear wheels of the car were powered by a Volkswagen GTI diesel engine that was modified to run on soybean oil and there were plans to power the front wheels by an alternating current propulsion electric motor and then later by an azure motor, but was never effectuated. The car was not only fast and economical, but also ecologically-friendly, thereby achieving its goal. According to the fuel efficiency competition, the car was given a wide media coverage by TV channels like the Discovery Channel, ABC, NBC, CABLE TV, and various car magazines.

Somewhere between twenty and forty were produced and exported to the United States by K-1 Engineering before production ceased. The kit was plagued by poor support, lack of assembly instructions and an extremely difficult build process due to ill-conceived design aspects. In 2011, B-Racing was born and gained the rights and tooling to begin manufacturing again. Since then countless improvements, refinements, and available upgrades have been made including several options for using different donor cars. Pricing has also been reduced from the original £16,200 to £8,100.

Gallery

Notes

External links
 B-Racing current manufacturer of K1 Attack kit cars
  K-1 Attack Roadster Video at the topspeed.com
  The World's 1st Hybrid Supercar built on a K-1 Attack base
  K1 Attack Forum

Roadsters
Cars introduced in 2002
First car made by manufacturer
Cars of Slovakia
Rear mid-engine, rear-wheel-drive vehicles